The MAP45 Armoured Personnel Carrier (a.k.a. MAP 'four five') is a Rhodesian/Zimbabwean 4x4d heavy troop-carrying vehicle (TCV) first introduced in 1978 based on a Mercedes-Benz truck chassis. It remains in use with the Zimbabwe National Army.

History 

The MAP45 Armoured Personnel Carrier ('MAP' stands for mine and ambush protected in Rhodesian military jargon) was developed in 1977-78 by the Rhodesian Army Workshops as a light version of the MAP75 TCV. Production started early in 1978 at Army Workshops but in order to meet the increasing demand, manufacture was contracted out to the Rhodesian private firm Zambesi Coachworks Ltd of Salisbury (now Harare).

General description 

The MAP45 consists of an all-welded body with a cut-down troop compartment built on a modified Mercedes-Benz 4.5 ton Series LA911B truck chassis.  Adapted from the MAP75 TCV, the open-topped hull or 'capsule' is faceted at the sides, which were designed to deflect small-arms' rounds, and a flat deck reinforced by a v-shaped 'crush box' meant to deflect mine blasts. Three inverted U-shaped low 'Roll bars' were fitted to protect the fighting compartment from being crushed in case the vehicle turned and roll over after a landmine detonation.  Due to the shortened top hull, their reduced height presented less of a problem since it did not hamper movements inside the troop compartment as in the MAP75.

Protection
The hull was made of ballistic 10mm mild steel plate; front windscreen and side windows had 40mm bullet-proof laminated glass.

Armament 

Rhodesian MAP45s were usually armed with a FN MAG-58 7.62mm Light Machine Gun (LMG), sometimes installed on a locally produced one-man MG armoured turret to protect the gunner.  Vehicles assigned to convoy escorting duties ('E-type') had a Browning M1919A4 7.62mm medium machine gun mounted on an open-topped, cylinder-shaped turret (dubbed 'the dustbin').  For 'externals' twin Browning MG pintle mounts were sometimes fitted, placed behind the driver's compartment.  The Zimbabwean vehicles after 1980 sported single pintle-mounted Soviet-made 12.7mm and 14.5mm Heavy Machine Guns (HMG) instead.

Variants 

Troop-Carrying Vehicle (TCV) – is the standard IFV/APC version, armed with either a single LMG (Rhodesian SF 1978-79) or HMG (ZNA 1980-present) and capable of carrying 12 infantrymen.
Convoy escorting version – designated 'E-type', this is a basic IFV/APC version fitted with the Browning MG 'dustbin' turret.
Command vehicle – command version equipped with radios and map boards.

Combat history 
The MAP45 TCV soon became a popular vehicle among the elite units of the Rhodesian Security Forces – including the Rhodesian African Rifles (RAR), the Rhodesian Light Infantry (RLI), and the Rhodesian SAS – who employed it late in the war on their cross-border covert raids ('externals') against ZIPRA and ZANLA guerrilla bases in the neighboring Countries, such as the September 1979 raid on the ZANLA's New Chimoio base in Mozambique (Operation "Miracle"). 

After independence, the MAP45 entered service with the Zimbabwe National Army (ZNA) in early 1980 and participated in the large military exercises conducted at Somabula Plain, Matabeleland that same year.  ZNA's 'Four Fives' were thrown into action in November 1980 against ZIPRA troops at the 1st Battle of Entumbane and later at the February 1981 2nd Battle of Entumbane (near Bulawayo, Matabeleland), and later again after February 1982 by helping to put down the Super-ZAPU insurgency in Matabeleland.  The converted MAP45 TCVs were also employed by the ZNA forces in Mozambique during the Mozambican Civil War, guarding the Mutare-Beira oil pipeline from 1982 to 1993. The MAP45 later served with the ZNA contingent sent to the Democratic Republic of Congo during the Second Congo War from 1998 to 2002.

Operators 

 – some 200 or 300 vehicles in service with the Rhodesian Security Forces in 1978-1980 passed on to successor state. 
 – Still in service with the ZNA.

See also
Bullet TCV
Crocodile Armoured Personnel Carrier
Hippo APC
Thyssen Henschel UR-416
Rhodesian Armoured Corps
MAP75 Armoured Personnel Carrier
Mine Protected Combat Vehicle
Weapons of the Rhodesian Bush War

Notes

References 

Laurent Touchard, Guerre dans le bush! Les blindés de l'Armée rhodésienne au combat (1964-1979), Batailles & Blindés Magazine n.º 72, April–May 2016, pp. 64–75.  (in French)
Neil Grant & Peter Dennis, Rhodesian Light Infantryman 1961–80, Warrior series 177, Osprey Publishing Ltd, Oxford 2015. 
Peter Abbott & Raffaele Ruggeri, Modern African Wars (4): The Congo 1960-2002, Men-at-arms series 492, Osprey Publishing Ltd, Oxford 2014. 
 Peter Gerard Locke & Peter David Farquharson Cooke, Fighting Vehicles and Weapons of Rhodesia 1965-80, P&P Publishing, Wellington 1995. 
 Peter Stiff, Taming the Landmine, Galago Publishing Pty Ltd., Alberton (South Africa) 1986.

External links
MAP 4.5 (Mine & Ambush Protected) Vehicle.
Rhodesian Mine Ambush Protected Vehicles 1975-80

Armoured personnel carriers of the Cold War
Weapons of Rhodesia
Wheeled armoured personnel carriers
Military vehicles introduced in the 1970s